is a Japanese national university located in Bunkyō, Tokyo, Japan. Established in 1928, it was the first national school of dentistry in Japan. TMDU is one of top 9 Designated National University and selected as a Top Type university of Top Global University Project by the Japanese government, and offers baccalaureate and graduate degrees in medicine, dentistry, and related fields. The university ranked 217th in the world and 7th in Japan in 2010.

History 
The school received university status in 1944 as Tokyo Medical and Dental College. It was renamed to Tokyo Medical and Dental University in 1946. Separate Faculty of Medicine and Faculty of Dentistry were established in 1951, along with a research institute dedicated to materials, which was later expanded to the current Institute of Biomaterials and Bioengineering. In 2000, Graduate School of Medical and Dental Sciences replaced the former Graduate School. In accordance with the National University Corporation Act, the school became a National University Corporation in 2004.

Organization

Graduate Schools 
 Graduate School of Medical and Dental Sciences
 Graduate School of Health Care Sciences
 Graduate School of Biomedical Science

Faculties and Colleges 
 Faculty of Medicine, Medical department (medical school)
Faculty of Medicine, Health and Hygiene department (nursing school)
 Faculty of Dentistry, Dental department (dental school)
Faculty of Dentistry, Oral Health department  
 College of Liberal Arts and Sciences

Institutes and Research centers 
 Institute of Biomaterials and Bioengineering
 Medical Research Institute
 Institute for Library and Media Information Technology
 Center for Education Research in Medicine and Dentistry (joint)
 Research Center for Medical and Dental Sciences (joint)
 Center for Experimental Animal (joint)
 International Exchange Center (joint)
 Life Science and Bioethics Research Center (joint)
 Center for Interprofessional Education (joint)
 International Research Center for Molecular Science in Tooth and Bone Diseases (Global COE Program)

University Hospitals 
 University Hospital of Medicine (800 beds)
 University Hospital of Dentistry (60 beds, 317 dental chair units)

International Exchange 
Tokyo Medical and Dental University has over 200 international students, mainly from Asian countries. The university has university exchange and affiliation agreements with universities from over 25 other countries. Since 2002 the university has had an agreement with Partners Harvard Medical International involving enhancement of TMDU's education programs. An exchange program between Faculty of Medicine and Imperial College London was launched in 2004. The faculty of dentistry has agreements with several schools in the US, UK, Australia and Canada.

Campuses

Yushima Campus 

 Campus is the main campus located in Bunkyō, close to Ochanomizu Station, which contains the main university hospital buildings and research facilities including the 126m-tall M&D tower. The campus is close to Yushima Tenjin, from which the university plum blossom symbol (five petals) was derived.

Surugadai Campus 
 Campus is also located close to Ochanomizu Station and houses the Medical Research Institute and Institute of Biomaterials and Bioengineering.

Kounodai Campus 
The Kounodai Campus houses the College of Liberal Arts and Sciences where undergraduate students start their university studies, and International House dormitory. This campus is located in Ichikawa City, Chiba Prefecture, about 40 minutes from Yushima Campus by train.

Ranking 
According to the Times Higher Education World University Rankings data in 2010 the university ranked 217th in the world and 7th among all Japanese universities. In the QS World University Rankings in 2010, TMDU ranked number one in Asia in terms of paper citations.

References

External links

 TMDU website (English)

Bunkyō
Tokyo Medical and Dental University
Japanese national universities
Medical schools in Japan
1928 establishments in Japan
Educational institutions established in 1928